Chabab Riadhi de Belouizdad is an Algerian professional football club based in Belouizdad, Algiers Province. The club was formed in Belcourt in 1962 as Chabab Riadhi de Belcourt, The club was renamed Chabab Riadhi de Belouizdad in 1994.

The club has won a total of 16 major trophies, including the national championship 6 times also won the Algerian Cup a record 8 times, the Algerian Super Cup 1 time, and the Algerian League Cup 1 time. The club has also never been out of the top two divisions of Algerian football since entering the Football League.

This is a list of the seasons played by CR Belouizdad from 1962 when the club first entered a league competition to the most recent seasons. The club's achievements in all major national and international competitions as well as the top scorers are listed. Top scorers in bold were also top scorers of Ligue 1. The list is separated into three parts, coinciding with the three major episodes of Algerian football:

History

Seasons

Key 

Key to league record:
P = Played
W = Games won
D = Games drawn
L = Games lost
GF = Goals for
GA = Goals against
Pts = Points
Pos = Final position

Key to divisions:
1 = Ligue 1
2 = Ligue 2

Key to rounds:
DNE = Did not enter
Grp = Group stage
R1 = First Round
R2 = Second Round
R32 = Round of 32

R16 = Round of 16
QF = Quarter-finals
SF = Semi-finals
RU = Runners-up
W = Winners

Division shown in bold to indicate a change in division.
Top scorers shown in bold are players who were also top scorers in their division that season.

Statistics

List of All-time appearances

List of leading goalscorers
Bold Still playing competitive football in CR Belouizdad.

Position key:
GK – Goalkeeper;
DF – Defender;
MF – Midfielder;
FW – Forward

1 Includes the Super Cup.
2 Includes the Confederation Cup and Champions League.
3 Includes the UAFA Club Cup.

Notes

References 

Seasons
 
CR Belouizdad